Adams Township is one of nine townships in Hamilton County, Indiana, United States. At the 2010 census, its population was 4,858 and it contained 2,056 housing units.

History
Adams Township was organized in 1833.

Geography
The streams of Baker Ditch, Cicero Creek, Eagle Creek, Fouch Ditch, Hinkle Creek, Jay Ditch, Jones Ditch, Lindley Ditch, Little Cicero Creek, McKinzie Ditch, Pearce Ditch, Prairie Creek, Ross Ditch and Teter Branch, run through the township.

Cities and towns
 Sheridan

Unincorporated communities
 Bakers Corner
 Boxley
 East Union
 Ekin
(This list is based on USGS data and may include former settlements.)

Adjacent townships
 Jefferson Township, Tipton County (north)
 Cicero Township, Tipton County (northeast)
 Jackson Township (east)
 Washington Township (south)
 Marion Township, Boone County (west)
 Sugar Creek Township, Clinton County (northwest)

Cemeteries
The township contains nine cemeteries: Boxley, Crown Hill, Phillips, Ridge, Spencer, Spicewood, Teter, Union Grove and Wiles.

Major highways
 U.S. Route 31
 State Road 38
 State Road 47

Airports and landing strips
 Black Hawk Airport
 Sheridan Airport
 Windy Knoll Airport

Education
Adams Township residents may obtain a free library card from Sheridan Public Library in Sheridan.

References
 
 United States Census Bureau cartographic boundary files

External links
 Indiana Township Association
 United Township Association of Indiana

Townships in Hamilton County, Indiana
Townships in Indiana